Tamu or Tat Mu is a town in Sagaing Region in north-west Myanmar near the border with the eastern Indian state of Manipur. It is the administrative seat for Tamu Township. Opposite the Indian town of Moreh, the town is home to an official border trade posts with India, which opened on 12 April 2005.

Transport
Tamu is something of a transport hub for cross-border traffic to India, being just across the border from Moreh.  It is on the alignment of a proposed railway connecting the two countries. Tamu is an important commercial town serving the Indian border town of Moreh. It is also a hub for smuggled goods from Thailand and China which are transported to India. The town is mainly populated by the Burmese, Chin ethnic people, and many others from throughout the country.

Highway to Thailand
India's foreign minister met with Myanmar's construction minister in Delhi on 22 February 2012, and spoke about opening a highway between Moreh, in India, and the Myanmar-Thai border near Mae Sot.

Climate

References

External links
"Tamu Map — Satellite Images of Tamu" Maplandia
http://www.thehindubusinessline.com/todays-paper/tp-others/tp-states/border-woes/article2099469.ece
http://e-pao.net/epPageExtractor.asp?src=features.Indo-Myanmar_relationship_on_bilateral_and_economic_cooperation.html..
http://www.akshardhool.com/2012/12/a-precursor-of-things-to-come.html
http://www2.irrawaddy.org/article.php?art_id=21159
http://www.forbes.com/sites/morganhartley/2013/03/26/burmas-second-chance-for-trade-with-india/
http://www.irrawaddy.org/india/burma-indo-border-market-threatened-by-indian-insurgents.html

Township capitals of Myanmar
Populated places in Sagaing Region
India–Myanmar border crossings